Francis de Sales, C.O., O.M. (21 August 156728 December 1622) was a French Catholic prelate who served as Bishop of Geneva and is a saint of the Catholic Church. He became noted for his deep faith and his gentle approach to the religious divisions in his land resulting from the Protestant Reformation. He is known also for his writings on the topic of spiritual direction and spiritual formation, particularly the Introduction to the Devout Life and the Treatise on the Love of God.

Life

Early years
Francis de Sales was born two months premature on 21 August 1567 in the Château de Sales into the noble Sales family of the Duchy of Savoy, in what is today Thorens-Glières, Haute-Savoie, France. His father was François de Sales, Lord of Sales, and Novel, and by marriage, de Boisy. His mother was a noblewoman, Françoise de Sionnaz, the only child of the prominent magistrate, Melchior de Sionnaz, Seigneur de Vallières, de la Thuile, and de Boisy. This being one of the noblest families in Savoy, Francis's father was generally known as M. de Boisy.

He was baptized Francis Bonaventura after his godparents, François de la Fléchère and Damoiselle Bonaventure de Chevron-Villette, who was also his widowed, maternal grandmother. His father wanted him, the first of his six sons, to attend the best schools in preparation for a career as a magistrate. He, therefore, enjoyed a privileged education in the nearby town of La Roche-Sur-Foron, and at the age of eight at the Capuchin college in Annecy.

Education and self-consecration

In 1578, de Sales went to the Collège de Clermont, then a Jesuit institution, to study rhetoric and humanities. On this first visit to Paris, he lived near the Église Sainte-Geneviève with his three cousins. As a nobleman, he was accompanied by his servant and by a priest tutor, Abbé Déage. To please his father, he took lessons in the gentlemanly pursuits of riding, dancing, and fencing. De Sales is described as intelligent and handsome, tall and well built with blue-grey eyes, somewhat reserved and quiet, and a welcome guest in the homes of the nobility among whom his father had connections.

In 1586 Francis de Sales attended a theological discussion about predestination, convincing him of his damnation to hell. A personal crisis of despair resulted. This conviction lasted through December 1586. His great despair made him physically ill and even bedridden for a time. Sometime in either late December or early January 1587, he visited the old parish of Saint-Étienne-des-Grès, Paris, where he prayed the "Memorare" before a famed statue of Our Lady of Good Deliverance, a Black Madonna. He consecrated himself to the Blessed Virgin Mary and decided to dedicate his life to God with a vow of chastity. He then became a tertiary of the Minim Order.

De Sales ultimately concluded that God had good in store for him, because "God is love", as the First Epistle of John attests. This faithful devotion to God not only expelled his doubts but also influenced the rest of his life and his teachings. His way of teaching Catholic spirituality is often referred to as the Way of Divine Love, or the Devout Life, taken from a book he wrote of a similar name: Introduction to the Devout Life.

De Sales completed his studies at Collège de Clermont and enrolled at the University of Padua in Italy, where he studied both law and theology. He was accompanied by his twelve-year-old brother, Gallois, also a student in Padua. De Sales took Antonio Possevino, a priest in the Society of Jesus, as his spiritual director.

Return to Savoy

In 1592, de Sales received his doctorate in law and theology and made up his mind to become a priest. He made a pilgrimage to Loreto, Italy, famous for its Basilica Della Santa Casa (Shrine of the Holy House) and then returned home to Savoy. As the eldest son and heir, he held the title of Seigneur de Villeroget. The Senate of Chambéry admitted him as a lawyer. Meanwhile, his father secured various positions for Francis, including an appointment as a senator. His father also chose a wealthy noble heiress as his bride. But Francis refused to marry, preferring to stay focused on his chosen path. His father initially refused to accept that Francis had chosen the priesthood rather than fulfill his expectations with a political-military career. His cousin, Canon Louis de Sales, persuaded the Bishop of Geneva, Claude de Granier, to obtain for Francis the position of provost of the cathedral chapter of Geneva, a post in the patronage of the pope. It was the highest office in the diocese; M. de Boisy yielded. After signing over to his younger brother, Louis, his title and right of succession, Francis was ordained in 1593.

Priest and provost
Because the Calvinists controlled Geneva, the bishop resided about twenty miles south, in Annecy. De Sales preached in the Cathedral of Annecy, at parish churches, and before confraternities. He was an effective speaker, his voice was deep and rich in tone, his speech somewhat slow and measured. His sermons were comparatively short and without the customary displays of erudition. He avoided controversy and focused on a particular point of duty, a specific virtue, or the correction of some vice. The cathedral chapter recommended that, although only twenty-seven years of age, the provost be named Grand Penitentiary of the diocese, with the result that de Sales found himself taking many more confessions.

Chamblais
In 1594, the Duke of Savoy requested the Bishop to send a missioner to Chamblais, an area that had been long held by the Swiss, and only recently returned to Savoy. The task would be both difficult and dangerous; and the most qualified for the assignment was the provost. Despite his family's objections, de Sales readily accepted. Accompanied only by his cousin, the Canon Louis, they made their base the fortress of Allinges, to which the Governor of the Province, Baron d'Hermance, insisted they return each night. Gradually they expanded their efforts, with de Sales concentrating on Thonon-les-Bains, which had become almost completely Calvinist. He also attended the Savoyard soldiers garrisoned at Allinges.

They met great opposition from the Geneva ministers who accused de Sales of being a sorcerer. He moved to Thonon, where he boarded with a widow, who on one occasion hid him from some armed men. More than once he escaped death at the hands of assassins. His mother managed to send him some linen and money, which he distributed to the poor. A good deal of his religious instruction was handled individually and privately. It was at this time that Francis began writing pamphlets which were later collected and published as The Catholic Controversy. Gradually the mission began to show some small success.

In 1599 he was appointed coadjutor bishop of Geneva. In 1602, he was sent on a diplomatic mission to Henry IV of France, to negotiate the restoration of Catholic worship in Gex, a part of the diocese that had been returned to France. He was invited to give the Lenten sermons at the Chapel Royal. The morals at court reflected those of the King, which were notorious, yet King Henry became personally attached to Francis and is said to have observed, "A rare bird, this Monsieur de Genève, he is devout and also learned; and not only devout and learned but at the same time a gentleman. A very rare combination."

While in Paris, he also met Cardinal Berulle and Madame Acarie. They consulted with him on matters such as the introduction of Teresa of Ávila's Carmelites into France and plans for the reforming of monasteries and convents. He was consulted on matters of conscience by persons at court.

Bishop of Geneva
In 1602, Bishop Granier died, and Sales was consecrated Bishop of Geneva by Vespasien Gribaldi, assisted by Thomas Pobel and 
Jacques Maistret, O.Carm. as co-consecrators. He resided in Annecy (now part of modern-day France) because Geneva remained under Calvinist control and therefore closed to him. His diocese became famous throughout Europe for its efficient organization, zealous clergy and well-instructed laity, an achievement in those days.

He worked closely with the Order of Friars Minor Capuchin, which was very active in preaching the Catholic faith in his diocese. They appreciated his cooperation so much that in 1617 they made him an official associate of the Order, the highest honor possible for a non-member. It is said that at Evian, on the south shore of Lake Geneva, Francis of Assisi appeared to him and said: "You desire martyrdom, just as I once longed for it. But, like me, you will not obtain it. You will have to become an instrument of your own martyrdom." During his years as bishop, de Sales acquired a reputation as a spellbinding preacher and something of an ascetic. His motto was, "He who preaches with love, preaches effectively." His goodness, patience and mildness became proverbial.

Author
These last qualities come through in Sales' books, the most famous of which was Introduction to the Devout Life, which – unusual for the time – was written for laypeople, especially for women. In it he counseled charity over penance as a means of progressing in the spiritual life. Sales also left the mystical work, the "Treatise on the Love of God", and many highly valued letters of spiritual direction, including those with Jane Frances de Chantal compiled in the Letters of Spiritual Direction.

Founder

Along with Chantal, Sales founded the women's Order of the Visitation of Holy Mary (Visitandines) in Annecy on 6 June 1610. Denis-Simon de Marquemont, the archbishop, required the order's members maintain cloistered lives.

Sales also established a community of men, an Oratory of St. Philip Neri, at Thonon-les-Bains, with himself as the superior or Provost. This work, however, was crippled by his death, and that foundation soon died out.

Death
In December 1622 de Sales was required to travel in the entourage of Charles Emmanuel I, Duke of Savoy, for the Duke's Christmas tour of his domain. Upon arrival in Lyon, de Sales chose to stay in the gardener's hut at the Visitandine monastery in that city. While there he suffered a stroke, from which he died on 28 December 1622.

Veneration after his death

Francis de Sales has been styled "the Gentleman Saint" because of his patience and gentleness.
Despite the resistance of the populace of Lyon to moving his remains from that city, Sales was buried on 24 January 1623 in the church of the Monastery of the Visitation in Annecy, which he had founded with Chantal, who was also buried there. Their remains were venerated there until the French Revolution. Many miracles have been reported at his shrine.

De Sales' heart was kept in Lyon, in response to the popular demand of the citizens of the city to retain his remains. During the French Revolution, however, it was saved from the revolutionaries by being carried by the Visitation nuns from Lyons to Venice.

Francis de Sales was beatified in 1661 by Pope Alexander VII, who then canonized him four years later. He was declared a Doctor of the Church by Pope Pius IX in 1877.

The Roman Catholic Church celebrates Saint Francis de Sales' feast on 24 January, the day of his burial in Annecy in 1624. From the year 1666, when his feast day was inserted into the General Roman Calendar, until its 1969 revision, he was celebrated on 29 January.

Francis is remembered in the Church of England with a Lesser Festival on 24 January. In 2022, Francis de Sales was officially added to the Episcopal Church liturgical calendar with a feast day shared with Jane Frances de Chantal on 12 December.

Patronage
In 1923, Pope Pius XI proclaimed him a patron of writers and journalists, because he made extensive use of broadsheets and books both in spiritual direction and in his efforts to convert the Calvinists of the region. Sales developed a sign language in order to teach a deaf man about God. Because of this, he is the patron saint of the deaf.

Having been founded as one of the first non-cloistered group of sisters after attempts to do so with the Visitation Sisters founded by de Sales and de Chantal, the Sisters of St. Joseph (founded in Le Puys, France, in 1650) take Francis de Sales as one of their patrons.
The Missionaries of St. Francis de Sales, founded by the Abbé Pierre Mermier in 1838, were the first Religious congregation to adopt his spirituality in the 19th century.
The religious institute of the Salesians of Don Bosco, founded by John Bosco in 1859 (approved by the Holy See in 1874), is also known as the Society of Saint Francis de Sales, and is placed under his patronage.
The Oblate Sisters of St. Francis de Sales were founded by Léonie Aviat and Louis Brisson, under the spiritual guidance of the Marie de Sales Chappuis in 1866. The Oblates of St. Francis de Sales order for men was later founded by Brisson, also under the guidance of Marie de Sales, in 1875.
The Congregation of the Oratory of St. Philip Neri count him as one of their patrons, given his close association with St. Philip Neri's disciples, and his founding of the Oratory in Thonon, France (now defunct), of which he was the first superior.
The Paulist Fathers in the United States count him.

Legacy

Congregations
In the 19th century, his vision for religious communities was revived. Several religious institutes were founded during that period for men and women desiring to live out the spiritual path which de Sales had developed.

The Missionaries of St. Francis de Sales (MSFS), founded by the Abbé Pierre Mermier in 1838, were the first congregation to adopt his spirituality in the 19th century.
The religious institute of the Salesians of Don Bosco (SDB), founded by John Bosco in 1859 (approved by the Holy See in 1874), is also known as the Society of Saint Francis de Sales, and is placed under his patronage.
The Oblate Sisters of St. Francis de Sales (OSFS) were founded by Léonie Aviat and Louis Brisson, under the spiritual guidance of the Marie de Sales Chappuis in 1866.
The Oblates of St. Francis de Sales (OSFS) order for men was later founded by Brisson, also under the guidance of Marie de Sales, in 1875.
The Paulist Fathers in the United States count him as one of their patrons.

The Institute of Christ the King Sovereign Priest, a society of priests founded in the 20th century, also has Francis de Sales as one of their three primary patrons. One of the major apostolates of the Institute in the United States is the Oratory of St. Francis de Sales in St. Louis, Missouri.

Influence on other saints
Vincent de Paul met Francis de Sales in Paris in 1618 or 1619. Francis de Sales' spirituality and writings, especially An Introduction to the Devout Life, and Treatise on the Love of God, were to have a profound influence on Vincent.

His writings on the perfections of the heart of Mary as the model of love for God influenced John Eudes to develop the devotion to the Hearts of Jesus and Mary.

Namesakes

Educational institutions 
 St Francis College, Letchworth Garden City, Hertfordshire, England
St. Francis de Sales Catholic Junior School, Liverpool, England
School of Sacred Heart St. Francis de Sales, Bennington, Vermont
St. Francis de Sales Catholic School, Toronto, ON, Canada
St Francis De Sales Catholic School, Houston, TX
St. Francis de Sales Catholic School Riverside CA
St. Francis de Sales Catholic School, Lake Zurich, IL
St. Francis de Sales School, Morgantown, WV, United States
St Francis de Sales School, Beckley, West Virginia 
St Francis de Sales School, Philadelphia, Pennsylvania
 St. Francis de Sales Catholic High School, Walla Walla, Washington
 DeSales High School in Louisville, Kentucky
 DeSales University, located in Center Valley, Pennsylvania (formerly Allentown College of St. Francis de Sales)
 Mount de Sales Academy, Catonsville, Maryland
 Mount de Sales Academy, Georgia
 Saint Francis de Sales Seminary Milwaukee, Wisconsin
 Salesianum School, Wilmington, DE, United States
 St. Francis DeSales High School in Columbus, OH, United States
 St. Francis de Sales High School in Chicago, IL, United States
 St. Francis de Sales High School in Toledo, OH, United States
 St. Francis de Sales College, in Mount Barker, South Australia, Australia
 St. Francis de Sales – St. Stephen School, in Geneva, NY, United States
 St. Francis de Sales School, in Nagpur, India, managed by the Missionaries of St. Francis de Sales
 St. Francis de Sales School, in New Delhi, India, managed by the Missionaries of St. Francis de Sales
 St. Francis de Sales School, in Gangapur City, India, managed by the Missionaries of St. Francis de Sales
St.Francis De sales School, in Nallasopara, India, managed by the Missionaries of St.Francis de Sales
 St. Francis de Sales School, in Dhemaji, India, managed by the Missionaries of St. Francis de Sales
 St. Francis de Sales School, Nizamabad, Telangana, India.
 St. Francis de Sales School (Wellington, New Zealand)
 St. Francis de Sales High School, Francis Nagar, Korutla
 St. Francis de Sales School for the Deaf in Brooklyn, New York
 St. Francis de Sales College, in Nagpur, India
 The three seminary departments in the Archdiocese of Lipa are named after St. Francis de Sales (St. Francis de Sales Minor, Major, and Theological Seminary)
 St Francis de Sales College, Bengaluru, India
 SFS Public School and Junior College, Kerala(Ettumanoor), India
 St. Francis de Sales elementary school, Lake Geneva, WI, United States
 St. Francis de Sales School, Salisbury, MD, United States
 St. Francis de Sales Regional Catholic School, Herkimer, NY, United States
 St. Francis de Sales Catholic School, Lockport, NY, United States (formerly St. Francis de Sales High School)
 St. Francis de Sales School, Sherman Oaks, CA, United States

Others 
 The island of St. François Atoll
 Saint Francis Hospital & Medical Center in Hartford, CT, United States.
 St. Francis de Sales Broadcast Center in Batangas City, Philippines houses two radio stations under the Catholic Media Network: 99.1 Spirit FM and ALFM 95.9 Radyo Totoo
St. Francis de Sales Roman Catholic Church
 St. Francis de Sales Roman Catholic Church (Charlestown, Mass.)
 St  Francis de Sales Roman Catholic Church (Purcellville, Virginia)
St. Francis de Sales Roman Catholic Church, Morgantown, WV, United States
St. Francis de Sales Church (Norton Shores, Michigan), Norton Shores, MI, United States
St Francis de Sales, Hampton Hill and Upper Teddington

Bibliography
 Francis de Sales, Introduction to the Devout life, London, 2012. limovia.net 
 Francis de Sales, Treatise on the Love of God [known as "Theotimus"], London, 2012. limovia.net 
 Introduction to the Devout Life (Translated and Edited by John K. Ryan), Doubleday, 1972. 
 The Catholic Controversy: St. Francis de Sales' Defense of the Faith, TAN Books, 1989. 
 Set Your Heart Free (Edited by John Kirvan), Ave Maria Press, 2008. 
 Sermons of St. Francis de Sales on Prayer, TAN Books, 1985. 
 Sermons of St. Francis de Sales on Our Lady, TAN Books, 1985.  
 Sermons of St. Francis de Sales For Lent, TAN Books, 2009.  
 Sermons of St. Francis de Sales for Advent and Christmas, TAN Books, 1987.

See also
 Saint Francis de Sales, patron saint archive
 Savoy

References

Sources

External links

 
 
 
 International Commission on Salesian Studies All about St. Francis de Sales worldwide
 Statue in St Peter's Square
 Founder Statue in St Peter's Basilica
 Saint Francis de Sales papers, Vault MSS 447 at L. Tom Perry Special Collections, Harold B. Lee Library, Brigham Young University
 Brief except from Treatise on the Love of God

Works
 Introduction to the Devout Life Frederick Pustet & Co. (192X)
 Set Your Heart Free Readings from De Sales
 Spiritual Conferences from Oblates of St. Francis de Sales
 An Abridgment of the Interior Spirit of the Religious of the Visitation of the Blessed Virgin Mary George Templeman (1834)
 The Mystical Flora of St. Francis de Sales; or, The Christian Life Under the Emblem of Plants M.H. Gill & Son (1877)
 Maxims and Counsels of St. Francis de Sales for Every Day in the Year M.H. Gill & Son(1884)
 Of the Love of God Rivington's (1888)
 The Secret of Sanctity, According to St. Francis de Sales and Father Crasset, S.J. Benziger Brothers (1893)
 Letters to Persons of the World Benziger Brothers (1894)
 The Catholic Controversy Burns and Oates (1909)
Letters to Persons in Religion Burns and Oates (1909)

 
 

 
 

1567 births
1622 deaths
People from Haute-Savoie
French Roman Catholic saints
Canonizations by Pope Alexander VII
Doctors of the Church
17th-century Roman Catholic bishops in the Republic of Geneva
Founders of Catholic religious communities
Early modern Christian devotional writers
Capuchins
Minims (religious order)
Oratorians
Oratorian saints
Roman Catholic mystics
Counter-Reformation
Incorrupt saints
French religious writers
French male writers
16th-century French writers
16th-century male writers
17th-century French writers
17th-century male writers
Lycée Louis-le-Grand alumni
University of Padua alumni
Burials in Auvergne-Rhône-Alpes
Anglican saints
Beatifications by Pope Alexander VII